The 2016 Supercopa MX was a Mexican football match-up played on 10 July 2016 between the champions of the Apertura 2015 Copa MX, Guadalajara, and the winners of the Clausura 2016 Copa MX, Veracruz. Like the 2015 edition, the 2016 Supercopa MX was one match at a neutral venue in the United States. This match took place at the StubHub Center in Carson, California. The 2016 Supercopa MX was part of a doubleheader, which also included the  2016 Campeón de Campeones, organized by Univision Deportes, Soccer United Marketing (SUM), and Liga MX.

Guadalajara won the match 2–0, earning a spot in the 2017 Copa Libertadores first stage as "Mexico 3".

Match details

See also
Apertura 2015 Copa MX
Clausura 2016 Copa MX

References

2016
2016–17 in Mexican football